Sidonius was the third Bishop of Passau from about 754 to 763–764.

Sidonius appears in a donation deed of the Passau domicile. He was a monk from Ireland who distinguished himself as a scientifically high-ranking theologian and probably belonged to the later Salzburg bishop Virgil of Salzburg's social circle.

References

Year of birth unknown
8th-century bishops in Bavaria
Roman Catholic bishops of Passau